Bardo is the seventh album of composer Peter Michael Hamel, released in 1981 through Kuckuck Schallplatten.

Track listing

Personnel
Peter Michael Hamel – pipe organ, electronic organ, synthesizer
Ulrich Kraus – synthesizer, production, engineering

References

1981 albums
Kuckuck Schallplatten albums
Peter Michael Hamel albums